The Lhasa Evening Post, or Lasa Wanbao, commonly known as Lhasa Evening News, was a Lhasa-based metropolitan newspaper published in Chinese and Tibetic languages in China. The newspaper was founded on July 1, 1985, and was the official newspaper of the Lhasa Municipal Committee of the Chinese Communist Party (中共拉萨市委).

History
On November 29, 2000, Lhasa Evening Post officially launched its online version. Starting in 2004, it began to publish color newspapers every day. 

On July 6, 2009, Lhasa Evening Post was newly revised.  On January 1, 2020, the paper ceased publication.

References

Defunct newspapers published in China
Newspapers established in 1985
1985 establishments in China
Publications disestablished in 2020
2020 disestablishments in China